{{Speciesbox
|name=Speckled bush-cricket
| image = Leptophyes punctatissima fg06.jpg
| image_caption = Female with upwards-curving ovipositor
| image2 = Leptophyes punctatissima male Hng20061027 64.jpg
| image2_caption = Male with rudimentary wings on top of his back
|genus=Leptophyes
|species=punctatissima
|authority=(Bosc, 1792)
|synonyms_ref=
|synonyms={{collapsible list|bullets = true
|Locusta punctatissima Bosc, 1792
|Barbitistes punctatissima Bosc, 1792
|Odontura punctatissima Bosc, 1792
|Locusta autumnalis Hagenbach, 1822
|Ephippigera glabricauda (Borck, 1848)
|Leptophyes standishii Miller, 1890
|Ephippiger virescens Stephens, 1835
|Ephippigera virescens (Stephens, 1835
}}}}

The speckled bush-cricket (Leptophyes punctatissima) is a flightless species of bush-cricket belonging to the family Tettigoniidae. The species was originally described as Locusta punctatissima in 1792.Bosc. 1792. Actes Soc. Hist. Nat. Paris 1:44

Distribution
The speckled bush-cricket is common across much of Europe. It ranges from the British Isles, France, Poland and Belgium in the west to the European parts of Russia in the east, and from southern Scandinavia in the north to southern Italy, Bulgaria and Greece. It has been recorded as far south as Israel. It is also present in the Nearctic realm.

Habitat
This species mainly occurs in dry shrubby environments, in open woodland, in scrub, hedgerows and in gardens, with birch, bramble and gorse.The Wildlife Trust

These bush-crickets are mainly grass-green with minute black speckles (more evident in the nymphs), as reflected in the common and Latin name of the species. Its colouring and secretive lifestyle, hidden away in the undergrowth, mean that it often passes unnoticed. The dorsal surface of the abdomen features an orangey-brown stripe; this is more pronounced in the male than the female. A yellow-white stripe extends backwards from the eyes. The lower legs and feet are brownish. The antennae are twice as long as the body. The species is brachypterous: the male's forewings are reduced to small flaps, and those of the female are even more reduced. The hindwings are completely absent, and both males and females are flightless. The female's ovipositor is laterally compressed and curves sharply upwards.

Biology
These bush-crickets can be found from April to November.
Nymphs emerge in May and develop into their adults during late summer. Females lay their eggs in late summer in the bark of a tree or a plant stem. Then they overwinter until next spring.

The song of the male, produced by rubbing the right wing against a tooth-like projection at the base of the left, is short (1 to 10 ms) and feeble, barely audible to human ears; at a frequency of 40 kHz, it can best be heard with the aid of a bat detector. Unlike other cricket species, the female is able to respond to the male's calls with a weaker call of her own, which attracts the male to her.

References

External links

 Sound recordings of Leptophyes punctatissima on BioAcoustica
 Common Bush-crickets

Phaneropterinae
Orthoptera of Asia
Orthoptera of Europe
Insects described in 1792
Taxa named by Louis Augustin Guillaume Bosc